Santa Claus Rooftop Junkie is the fourth studio album by David Peel and The Lower East Side, released in 1974 through Orange Records Ltd.

Track listing

Personnel 
Michael Angelo – guitar, backing vocals
Les Fradkin – bass guitar, guitar, keyboards, backing vocals
Andy "Coke" Friedman – drums, percussion
David Peel – lead vocals, guitar, art direction
Mark Shatasky – backing vocals
Ron Skoler – backing vocals
Paul Thornton – guitar, percussion, backing vocals
A. J. Weberman – backing vocals, narrator
Grimes - trumpet
Technical
Tom Doyle - recording and mixing engineer

References 

1974 albums
David Peel (musician) albums